Christopher J. Waild (born 1982 in North Tonawanda, New York), is an American screenwriter. Waild grew up in Springfield, Ohio and attended the North Carolina School of the Arts where he studied screenwriting. He lives in Los Angeles, California and is a full-time staff writer on the CBS series NCIS.

Film work
Co-wrote the 2007 American independent feature film Dog Days of Summer directed by Mark Freiburger.

Television work
Waild is currently a co-executive producer on the TV series, NCIS.

External links

American male screenwriters
Writers from Springfield, Ohio
People from North Tonawanda, New York
1982 births
Living people
Screenwriters from Ohio
Screenwriters from New York (state)